Seh Korreh (also known as Seh Korreh-ye Soflá) is a village in Dowreh Rural District, Chegeni District, Dowreh County, Lorestan Province, Iran. At the 2006 census, its population was 169, in 41 families.

References 

Towns and villages in Dowreh County